Punga is a village in Zambezi Region, Namibia.

References

Populated places in the Zambezi Region